Ayavalla Plantation was a quail hunting plantation located in northwest Leon County, Florida, established by John Henry Howard Phipps, son of John Shaffer Phipps of the prominent Phipps family.

Ayavalla was the Indian word used by Ellen Call Long for Lake Jackson. Long was the previous resident of nearby Orchard Pond Plantation and daughter of Governor Richard Keith Call.

Adjacent plantations:
 Luna Plantation to the north
 Meridian Plantation to the east

Ayavalla and the neighboring property of Elinor Klapp-Phipps Park host part of the Red Hills Horse Trials.

References

External links 
 Tall Timbers - Elinor Klapp-Phipps Park

Plantations in Leon County, Florida
Phipps family